Cyrtanaspis is a genus of beetles belonging to the family Scraptiidae.

Species:
 Cyrtanaspis phalerata Germar, 1831
 Cyrtanaspis sauteri Pic, 1911

References

Scraptiidae